Patrick Anthony Powers (8 October 1870 – 30 July 1948) was an American businessman who was involved in the movie and animation industry of the 1910s, '20s, and '30s as a distributor and producer. His firm, Celebrity Productions, was the first distributor of Walt Disney's Mickey Mouse cartoons (1928–29). After one year, Disney split with Powers, who started another animation studio with Disney's lead animator, Ub Iwerks.

Early career
Powers was born in Buffalo, New York. According to the Buffalo Courier-Express obituary dated August 1, 1948, his sister, Mary Ellen Powers, lived in Buffalo for her entire life.

Powers partnered with Joseph A. Schubert, Sr. and sold phonographs from 1900 to 1907, when they formed the Buffalo Film Exchange, which purchased films from producers and rented them to nickelodeons. In 1910, Powers left Buffalo for New York City, where he founded the Powers Moving Picture Company, also frequently billed in advertisements and credited in his films as "Powers Picture Plays". Early examples of his studio's releases include The Woman Hater (1910) with Violet Heming, Pearl White, and Stuart Holmes; the comedy Lost in a Hotel (1911); the children's fantasy film An Old-Time Nightmare (1911); and the Western Red Star's Honor (1911).

In 1912, Powers' company merged with Carl Laemmle's Independent Moving Pictures Company (IMP) film company and others to create what eventually would become Universal Pictures. He served as treasurer of the Universal Film Manufacturing Company. Later, in 1916 and 1917, Powers introduced a cartoon series titled Fuller Pep, which was similar to Paul Terry's Farmer Al Falfa series. Nine cartoons were produced.

The 1920s
Between the 1922 reorganization of Film Booking Office of America and October 1923, Powers, as one of the company's new American investors, was effectively in command. Powers had previously led his own filmmaking company, part of the multiple merger that created Universal Pictures in 1912. Powers apparently changed the name of Robertson-Cole/FBO to the Powers Studio for a brief period, though there is no record of the company ever having produced or released a film under that banner. In 1925 he moved briefly to take over at the distribution outfit Associated Exhibitors. In 1928, Joseph P. Kennedy and RCA head David Sarnoff merged FBO and the Keith-Albee-Orpheum theater circuit to form RKO Radio Pictures.

Powers invested in what remained of the sound film company DeForest Phonofilm in the spring of 1927. Lee De Forest was on the verge of bankruptcy, due to legal fees from a series of lawsuits against former associates Theodore Case and Freeman Harrison Owens. DeForest was by that time selling cut-price sound equipment to second-run movie theaters wanting to convert to sound on the cheap.

In June 1927, Powers made an unsuccessful takeover bid for De Forest's company. In the aftermath of the failed takeover, Powers hired a former DeForest technician, William Garity, to produce a cloned version of the Phonofilm sound recording system, which became Powers Cinephone. By this time, De Forest was in too weak a financial position to mount a legal challenge against Powers for patent infringement.

Walt Disney and Ub Iwerks
In 1928, Powers sold Walt Disney the Powers Cinephone so that Disney could make sound cartoons such as Mickey Mouse's Steamboat Willie (1928). Unable to find a distributor for the sound cartoons, Disney began releasing his cartoons through Powers' company Celebrity Productions (also known as Celebrity Pictures).

After one year of successful Mickey Mouse and Silly Symphonies cartoons, Walt Disney confronted Powers in 1930 about money due to Disney from the distribution deal. Powers responded by signing Disney's head animator Ub Iwerks to an exclusive deal to create his own animation studio. The Iwerks Studio was only mildly successful, with cartoon series such as Flip the Frog and Willie Whopper, released through Metro-Goldwyn-Mayer, and the ComiColor cartoons, released by Celebrity Pictures. The Iwerks studio closed in 1936 and Iwerks subsequently returned to Disney. As for Disney, he would go on to distribute his cartoons without Powers to Columbia Pictures.

In his lifetime, Powers produced nearly 300 movies, most of them early silent films produced at Universal before 1913 or one-reel animated shorts. He is, however, also credited as a producer on Erich von Stroheim's The Wedding March (1928), along with Jesse Lasky and Adolph Zukor. (The latter was a former partner of Mitchell Mark who, like Powers, was a native of Buffalo, New York.)

Death
Patrick Powers, at age 77, died on 30 July 1948 at the Doctors Hospital in New York City after a brief illness. His August 1 obituary in The New York Times notes that at the time of his death he was president of the Powers Film Products Company of Rochester, New York. He also had two homes, one in Rochester and another in Westport, Connecticut. His obituary also states that he was survived by his sister Mary Ellen and a daughter, Mrs. Roscoe N. George of San Fernando, California. Powers' gravesite is at Holy Cross Cemetery in Lackawanna, New York, near Buffalo.

References

Sources
 Richard B. Jewell with Vernon Harbin, The RKO Story (New York: Arlington House/Crown, 1982) 
 Betty Lasky, RKO: The Biggest Little Major of Them All (Santa Monica, Calif.: Roundtable, 1989)

External links

1870 births
1948 deaths
American film production company founders
American film studio executives
Irish emigrants to the United States (before 1923)
People from County Waterford
Businesspeople from Buffalo, New York
Film producers from New York (state)
NBCUniversal people